Anway is a surname. Notable people with the surname include:
Carol E. Anway (born 1965), American industrial physicist
Charles H. Anway (1857–1949), American pioneering homesteader near Haines, Alaska
Susan Anway (1951–2021), American musician, vocalist for The Magnetic Fields

See also
Peter Anway, fictional character in The Disaster Artist (film)
Amway, a multi-level marketing company